Jadalathimmanahalli Krishnappa Srinivasa Murthy (born 15 May 1949), known popularly as Srinivasa Murthy, is an Indian actor and television director. He is mostly known for his work as a director having made many television series in Kannada, beginning in 2001, based on the lives of various Kannada philosophers and poets, and adaptations of the works of popular Kannada writers. As an actor, he is known for his work in Kannada cinema, appearing often in supporting roles. He began his career as a stage artiste in both professional and amateur theatre, before taking to films in 1977.

Career

Films 

Srinivasa Murthy became a producer of Kannada films quite early. He started off producing films with his friend Jai Jagadish. He made films like Maathru Devo Bhava and a comedy film Thaayigobba Tharlemaga with Kashinath and cast Chandrika (Kannada actress). Followed by Nambidare Nambi Bittare Bidi directed by Umesh which introduced Shruthi and Hosamane Aliya with Anant Nag and Bhavya. He then became a director with the children film Devara Makkalu that won lot of appreciation from critics. It also won an award for Best Children Film from the State government of Karnataka.

Television 
Parallel to his career in films, Murthy directed and starred in many television soaps. He made his debut as a director in 2001, with a Kannada series Anna Basavanna, also starring as the eponymous lead role Basava, a 12th-century philosopher and Kannada poet. The 70-episode series concluded in April 2002, and was aired on ETV Kannada. Following this, in the same year, he directed Pathala Bhairavi, a children fantasy series consisting of 52 episodes, based on the 11th-century Kashmiri poet Kshemendra's work of the same. Murthy appeared in the role of a Mantrik in the series. In 2007, he directed Triveni Sangama, a series based on the works of Anasuya Shankar (pen name, Triveni). He also starred in the series alongside C. R. Simha. In 2014, he made a series based on the life of Kanaka Dasa, a 16th-century philosopher and Kannada poet.

Personal life
Srinivasa Murthy was born on 15 May 1949 to Krishnappa and Nagamma in a village, Jadalathimmanahalli, in the Kolar district of the erstwhile Mysore State (in present-day Chikkaballapura district in Karnataka). Murthy served in the Survey Department under the Government of Karnataka, before entering films in 1977 with Hemavathi.

Filmography

As actor 

 Hemavathi (1977)
 Guru Shishyaru (1981)
 Keralida Simha (1981)
 Hosa Belaku (1982)
 Parajitha (1982)
 Kaviratna Kalidasa (1983) as Bhoja
 Bhaktha Prahlada (1983)
 Marali Gudige (1984)
 Avala Antharanga (1986)
 Thayi Karulu (1988)
 Shabarimale Swamy Ayyappa (1990)
 Kaliyuga Seethe (1992)
 Dore (1995)
 Ibbara Naduve Muddina Aata (1996)
 Mane Mane Ramayana (1996)
 Mungarina Minchu (1997)
 Chandramukhi Pranasakhi (1999)
 Shrirasthu Shubhamasthu (2000)
 Appu 2002
 Vijayadashami (2003) as Narasimha
 Valmiki (2005)
 Mr Bakra (2005)...Bettappa
 My Autograph (2006)
 Ashoka (2006)
 No 73, Shanthi Nivasa (2007)
 Yodha (2009)
 Gilli (2009)
 Aptharakshaka (2010)
 Prithvi (2010) as Prithvi Kumar's father
 Haggada Kone (2014)
 Shivam (2015)
 Mahakali (2015)
 Mana Mechida Bangaru (2015)
 Thippaji Circle (2015)
 Vamshodharaka (2015)
 Tyson (2016)
 Yuva Samrat (2016)
 Sri Omkara Ayyappane (2016)
 Doddmane Hudga (2016)
 Bangara s/o Bangarada Manushya (2017)
 Raj Vishnu (2017)
 Natasaarvabhowma (2019)
 Rajatantra (2021)
 Talaq Talaq Talaq (2021)

Television

Awards 

Karnataka State Film Awards
 1981–82: Best Supporting Actor—Naari Swargakke Daari
 1999–2000: Best Supporting Actor—Shrirasthu Shubhamasthu
 Awarded Honorary Dr. Rajkumar Lifetime Achievement Award in Karnataka State Film Awards 2018

References

External links
 
 Srinivasa Murthy filmography

1949 births
Indian male film actors
Male actors in Kannada cinema
People from Kolar district
Living people
Kannada male actors
Kannada film directors
Film directors from Karnataka
Indian male television actors
Male actors in Kannada television
20th-century Indian male actors
21st-century Indian male actors
Male actors from Karnataka
Recipients of the Rajyotsava Award 2016

ml:വിനയ പ്രസാദ്